The Hand of Peril is a 1916 American silent crime film directed by Maurice Tourneur and starring House Peters, June Elvidge and Ralph Delmore.

The film's sets were designed by the art director Ben Carré.

Cast
 House Peters as James Kestner  
 June Elvidge as Maura Lambert  
 Ralph Delmore as Frank Lambert  
 Doris Sawyer as 'Bull's Eye' Cherry 
 Roy Pilcher as Tony Morello

References

Bibliography
 Waldman, Harry. Maurice Tourneur: The Life and Films. McFarland, 2001.

External links

1916 films
1916 crime films
American crime films
Films directed by Maurice Tourneur
American silent feature films
American black-and-white films
World Film Company films
1910s English-language films
1910s American films
English-language crime films